Sianów is a town in Poland, in West Pomeranian Voivodeship, in Koszalin County.  It has 6,606 inhabitants (2009).

Notable people 
 Edward Żentara (1956–2011) a Polish actor, appearing in more than 50 films and television shows between 1978 and 2010.

External links
Official town webpage

Cities and towns in West Pomeranian Voivodeship
Koszalin County